Valerie Mahaffey (born June 16, 1953) is an American character actress and producer. She began her career starring in the NBC daytime soap opera The Doctors (1979–81), for which in 1980 she was nominated for the Daytime Emmy Award for Outstanding Supporting Actress in a Drama Series.

In 1992, Mahaffey won the Primetime Emmy Award for Outstanding Supporting Actress in a Drama Series for her role in the CBS drama series Northern Exposure. She later won fame through her portrayal of extroverted and friendly but ultimately insane women on the television shows Wings, Desperate Housewives, Devious Maids and Big Sky. Mahaffey also appeared in a number of movies, including Senior Trip (1995), Jungle 2 Jungle (1997), Jack and Jill (2011), Sully (2016), and most notably French Exit (2020), for which she received critical acclaim and an Independent Spirit Award nomination.

Early life 
Mahaffey was born in Sumatra, Indonesia, to a Canadian mother and a Texan father who met in New Brunswick, Canada. When Mahaffey was 16, the family moved to Austin, Texas, where she graduated from Austin High School. She earned a Bachelor of Fine Arts from the University of Texas at Austin in 1975 and later made her Broadway debut in the musical Rex.

Career 
Mahaffey was regular cast member in the soap opera The Doctors from 1979 to 1981, which earned her a nomination for Daytime Emmy Award for Outstanding Supporting Actress in a Drama Series in 1980. She starred in the film Women of Valor in 1986 and while the characters are fictitious, it portrayed women's roles in the Philippines during World War II. Also in 1986 Mahaffey co-starred in the cult satirical TV miniseries Fresno, which parodied popular TV soaps of the day. 

In the late 1980s, Mahaffey began acting in television comedies, like Newhart, Cheers, and Seinfeld. From 1992 to 1993, she starred in the short-lived NBC sitcom The Powers That Be and in the CBS sitcom Women of the House alongside Delta Burke in 1995. She played Tracy Milford in the 1995 film National Lampoon's Senior Trip and Jan Kempster in the 1997 film Jungle 2 Jungle. In 1999, she had a recurring role on ER. In 2003, she co-starred in the film Seabiscuit. In 2009, she appeared in seven episodes of Showtime comedy series United States of Tara. Her stage credits include Eastern Standard, Talking Heads, Top Girls, and Rex.

Mahaffey won the Primetime Emmy Award for Outstanding Supporting Actress in a Drama Series for her performance as the chronic hypochondriac Eve in the CBS series Northern Exposure in 1992. Mahaffey was the only actor from the series to win an Emmy Award.

Mahaffey played Alma Hodge in season 3 of ABC comedy-drama series Desperate Housewives from 2006 to 2007. Mahaffey made guest appearances on Quantum Leap, L.A. Law, Ally McBeal, Judging Amy, The West Wing, Law & Order: Special Victims Unit, Frasier, CSI: Crime Scene Investigation, Private Practice, Boston Legal, Without a Trace, and Raising Hope. She appeared on Glee as the mother of Emma Pillsbury from 2011 to 2013. Mahaffey co-starred as Fran Horowitz in short-lived TNT medical drama Monday Mornings in 2013. From 2013 to 2015, she had a recurring role on Lifetime Television comedy-drama series Devious Maids as Olivia Rice.

In 2016, Mahaffey played a supporting role as Diane Higgins in the  biographical drama film Sully directed by Clint Eastwood. In 2017, she began appearing in a recurring role in the CBS comedy series Young Sheldon. From 2019 to 2022, Mahaffey had a recurring role as Lorna Harding, Christina Applegate's mother-in-law in the Netflix comedy-drama series Dead to Me.

In 2020, Mahaffey starred opposite Michelle Pfeiffer in the comedy-drama film French Exit playing widow Madame Reynaud. Mahaffey received positive reviews from critics for her scene-stealing comedic performance in film. She has been listed as a contender for a nomination in the 2021 Academy Award for Best Supporting Actress category. Later in 2020, Mahaffey was cast in a series regular role in the ABC crime drama series Big Sky.

Filmography

References

External links 

 
 Valerie Mahaffey at FilmReference.com

1953 births
Living people
Actresses from Austin, Texas
American film actresses
American stage actresses
American television actresses
American soap opera actresses
American people of Canadian descent
Outstanding Performance by a Supporting Actress in a Drama Series Primetime Emmy Award winners
People from Sumatra
Moody College of Communication alumni
20th-century American actresses
21st-century American actresses